Homeobox protein Hox-D9 is a protein that in humans is encoded by the HOXD9 gene.

Function 

This gene belongs to the homeobox family of genes. The homeobox genes encode a highly conserved family of transcription factors that play an important role in morphogenesis in all multicellular organisms. Mammals possess four similar homeobox gene clusters, HOXA, HOXB, HOXC and HOXD, located on different chromosomes, consisting of 9 to 11 genes arranged in tandem. This gene is one of several homeobox HOXD genes located at 2q31-2q37 chromosome regions. Deletions that removed the entire HOXD gene cluster or 5' end of this cluster have been associated with severe limb and genital abnormalities. The exact role of this gene has not been determined.

See also 
 Homeobox

References

Further reading

External links 
 

Transcription factors